Don Navinsky (January 24, 1944) was a Democratic member of the Kansas House of Representatives, represented the 40th district.  He has served since February 25, 2009, replacing Rep. Melanie Meier when she was called up for active duty. He relinquished the seat upon Meier's return in January 2010.

Committee membership
Vision 2020
Veterans, Military and Homeland Security
Agriculture and Natural Resources

Major donors
The top 5 donors to Navinsky's 2008 campaign:
1. Navinsky, Donald J $2,067
2. Manville, Bill $250 	
3. Lexeco $250 	
4. The Heavy Constructors Assoc $200 	
5. Nen, Bill $100

References

External links
Kansas Votes profile
Follow the Money campaign contributions:
2008

Democratic Party members of the Kansas House of Representatives
Living people
1944 births